Padhiana is a village in the tehsil and district of Jalandhar, Punjab, India. It falls in Adampur block of the district. 
The village has 794 hectares (1962 acres) of land. The population of Padhiana was 2885 at the 1991 census.

Geography

Padhiana is located in the fertile plains of Doaba, Punjab. It is bordered by Bist Doab canal on West, Khanaura village on South, and a brook (Choe) on North.

Jalandhar, Hoshiarpur and Phagwara cities are all within 30 km of the village.

History

Padhiana is a remaining legacy of Minhas Confederation of villages. Minhas Rajputs of this village are descendants of Shri Baba Kati Deo Ji (alias Kati Ji), a feudal lord of the 16th century, who was a vassal to the Jaswal Raja (King) of Jaswan. Shri Kati Deo was the younger brother of legendary, Shri Mati Deo.

The founding ancestor of this village migrated from Daroli, today Daroli Kalan, when family fortunes split. The village today has seven Pattis (family branches). Detailed record of each Minhas family is maintained by genealogists in Hardwar, Uttarakhand.

In 1815, the village became a part of Sikh empire when territories of the Raja of Jaswan were confiscated by Ranjit Singh. Few decades later, following the second Anglo-Sikh war, it was transferred to British along with other territories of Punjab.

Historical personalities of this village include Sikh warriors, Sangat Singh Ji, Uday Singh Ji, and Bachiter Singh Ji; all served in the tenth Sikh Guru, Gobind Singh Ji's army. Later, Sikh Chiefs from this village served in the army of famous Sikh leader Banda Bahadur Singh Ji, who offered them a Fief (Jagir) which lies in what is today the Patiala district of Punjab. These Chiefs later built a fort and established Bahadurgarh village in their new land. A medieval well in Padhiana, although now sealed, still exists commemorating these Chiefs, and is called Bahadargarhian Da Khoo (the well of Bahadargarh Chiefs).

Prominent personalities from recent centuries include Col. Dilbagh Singh Minhas, the first Recruiting Officer at Jalandhar Cantt.  The first Commander-in-Chief of the country, General K.M. Cariappa came to this village at the invitation of Col. Dilbagh Singh Minhas on 4 March 1949. Col. Dilbagh Singh Minhas who enlisted Punjabis in the Army, Navy and Air Force from Padhiana and surrounding villages.  A prominent and well known personality in the Doaba region due to his charity work.  
Sardar Khajan Singh, a Safed Posh during British rule. His grandson Sardar Ujagar Singh was a member of Punjab Zila Parishad in post independence India. Sardar Dayal Singh of this village, who migrated to Kota Bundi, was a Member of Rajasthan Legislative Assembly in the 1950s. Er. Wattan Singh Minhas a Civil Engineering graduate from prestigious Thomson Engineering College, Roorkee (now, IIT, Roorkee) served as Chief Engineer in Central Public Works Department (CPWD). He is credited with construction of a number of Dams immediately after India's independence from British. His younger brother Captain Bhag Singh Minhas served the country as an army officer and in the martial tradition of the village is credited with active participation in the 1962, 1965 and 1971 wars. More recently, Sardar B.S. Minhas, an Indian Administrative Services officer, was Secretary (called Deputy Minister in some countries), Ministry of Small Scale Industries and Agro & Rural Industries of India, the highest position a public service officer can hold in Indian Government ministry.

In Military, Sardar Brigadier Manjit Singh of this village was awarded Maha Vir Chakra, India's second highest gallantry award, for his leadership in 1987 Jaffna operations of Indian Army. Major (later Brigadier) Virender Singh Minhas, Vir Chakra, the officer, who successfully led Indian Army's famous Siachan operation against Pakistan in 1984 also has Padhiana origin. The operation won many gallantry awards to its participant soldiers, including a Param Vir Chakra to Sardar Bana Singh, the only soldier to ever win this award while alive.

Among media personalities, Bollywood models and actors, brothers Rahul Dev and Mukul Dev have Padhiana ancestry. Also, famous Punjabi poet, lyricist and TV show producer Lal Padhianvi grew up in Padhiana.

The village has produced many eminent scientists, army officers, educationists, administrators, and artists, some of which are listed in later sections.

A Brahman Lady's tomb commemorating her Sati stands near the village North crematory reminiscent of the medieval traditions of Padhiana gentry. The pond adjoining the crematory is called "Tal Satiwati" or, in English, "Pond of the Sati Lady".

Transportation

Road: Phuglana on Hoshiarpur - Phagwara road is 4 km from Padhiana while Adampur on Hoshiarpur - Jalandhar road is 11 km.

Railway:  Khurdpur railway station is 10 km.

Airport: Raja Sansi airport in Amritsar is the nearest International Airport and is about 110 km from Padhiana.

Education, Health Care and other services

There is a bank( Punjab and sind bank), a post office, a government dispensary, and a primary school in the village. While, a high school, a degree college, an engineering college, a government hospital, and a private hospital are within 5 km of the village. Senior Secondary School, Padhiana is functional since many years and students from other nearing villages also study there. Statue of Shaheed Bachiter Singh is erected in the play ground of Padhiana by village residents and headed by Retd. Brigadier Amarjit Singh Minhas of Padhiana.

Demographics

The village is 95% Sikh and 5% Hindu. There are 7 Gurudwaras including Gurudwara Pahari Darwaja, Gurudwara Bohra Khoo and Bhagat Ravidas Gurdwara.  There is one Shiv dwala (a Hindu temple dedicated to Lord Shiva). There are also two other places of worship, 'Lakhan Da Datta ', located in the village, and 'Peer Badhe Shah Ji', about 3 km from the village. There is also a "BHAGWAN VALMIK MANDIR" , a "SHANI MANDIR" and a "GUGA JAHAR VEER MANDIR" This religious diversity in places of worship indicates Padhiana residents respect for all religions.

Administration 

The Panchayat (village council) administers the village affairs.  There are nine elected members to the panchayat, eight panch and a Sarpanch (Mayor).  The members are elected for a period of four years. Last elections were held in May 2008. Present Sarpanch was elected in September 2010.

Army officers of this village
(Excerpt from The Tribune dated August 11, 2006)

Although as many as 282 Army personnel, hailing from Padhiana village, have shown their valour in the World War I and World War II and more than 35 youth from the village still serve in the Indian Army, while some have joined the Indian Air Force has been ignored by the administration.

All the serving and over 400 ex-servicemen here say their courage and sacrifice has not been duly rewarded by the district administration. Their only demand to the administration — a Sainik Bhawan — is yet to be fulfilled.

While a hall, library room, meeting room and veranda has been completed in the past six years, the building is yet not ready for use, as there are no provisions for power connection, water supply, kitchen and toilets.

The village has an entrance gate in the memory of Subedar Bir Singh who fought in World War I as well as II. A stone erected outside a gurdwara pahari darwaja sahib ji in the village reads: "176 men went for war from this village from 1914 to 1919. Eight gave up their lives."

The first Commander-in-Chief of the country, General K.M. Cariappa came to this village at the invitation of Col. Dilbagh Singh Minhas on 4 March 1949. Col. Dilbagh Singh Minhas who enlisted Punjabis in the Army, Navy and Air Force, was the first Recruiting Officer at Jalandhar Cantt.

Padhiana residents (past and present)
Col. Dilbagh Singh Minhas first Indian Army Recruiting Officer at Jalandhar Cantt. 
Rahul Dev, Bollywood actor
Mukul Dev, Bollywood actor
Lal Padhianvi, Punjabi TV Show Host
Mahavir Chakra Brigadier Manjit Singh, Indian Army
 Late Subedar Tej Singh Minhas (British Indian Army, Appreciated and awarded for his chivalry during World War II)
 Late Er. Wattan Singh Minhas (Chief Engineer, CPWD, Govt. of India)
 Late Captain Bhag Singh Minhas (Indian Army)
 Prof.(Dr.) B.B.S.Parihar (Management Thinker and Economist- Grandson of Er. Wattan Singh Minhas)  
  https://www.padhiana.com
 Sardar Kartar Singh Minhas (Principal, Khalsa High School, Jaspalon, Ludhiana)
 Mr. Kalwaran Singh Minhas (Associate Professor)
 Late Dr. Rajinder Singh Minhas (Scientist)

Villages in Jalandhar district